Saint-Noël is a village municipality in the Canadian province of Quebec, located in La Matapédia Regional County Municipality.

Demographics 

Canada Census data before 2001:
 Population in 1996: 509 (+0.2% from 1991)
 Population in 1991: 508

Municipal council
 Mayor: Gilbert Sénéchal
 Councillors: Marcel D'Astous, Francine Gagné, Gilbert Marquis, Steeve Parent, Jean-Louis Roussel, Jean-Marc Turcotte

See also
 List of village municipalities in Quebec

References

Villages in Quebec
Incorporated places in Bas-Saint-Laurent
La Matapédia Regional County Municipality